is a railway station in Nan'yō, Yamagata, Japan, operated by the Yamagata Railway.

Lines
Miyauchi Station is a station on the Flower Nagai Line, and is located 3.0 rail kilometers from the terminus of the line at Akayu Station.

Station layout
Miyauchi Station has a single Island platform.

Platforms

Adjacent stations

History
The station was absorbed into the JR East network upon the privatization of JNR on 1 April 1987, and became a station on the Yamagata Railway from 26 October 1988, and was renamed to its present name on the same day.

Surrounding area
 Mogami River
 Kumano Shrine
  National Route 113

External links
  Flower Nagai Line 

Railway stations in Yamagata Prefecture
Yamagata Railway Flower Nagai Line
Railway stations in Japan opened in 1913